Brigadier-General Lord John Hay (c. 1668 – 25 August 1706) was the second son of John Hay, 2nd Marquess of Tweeddale. He served in the British Army under the Duke of Marlborough.

Military service
Hay was born the second son of John Hay, 2nd Marquess of Tweeddale. He became a captain in the Royal Scots Dragoons on 16 July 1689. He was promoted to major on 8 September 1692 and lieutenant-colonel on 28 February 1694. He was promoted to colonel in 1702 and became colonel of his regiment in 1704, having purchased the position from Viscount Teviot. He was promoted to brigadier-general on 1 January 1704, commanding the dragoons at several distinguished actions, particularly the Battle of Schellenberg where the unit dismounted and helped storm the heights on foot and also Blenheim and Ramillies where the regiment took prisoners of the famous Régiment du Roi and, according to tradition, won the distinction of wearing grenadiers' caps since enjoyed by the regiment.

Hay died on campaign from a lingering fever at Courtrai on 25 Aug. 1706, 'to the regret of the whole army.'

Personal life
Hay married twice; first to Lady Mary Dalzell, the only daughter of James Dalzell, 3rd Earl of Carnwath, by Lady Mary Seton. His second marriage was to Elizabeth, daughter of Sir Charles Orby of Crowland, Lincolnshire. Elizabeth survived him and was later remarried to Major-general Robert Hunter.

Citations

References

 Dalton, Charles (2006). The Blenheim Roll 1704. Naval & Military Press.
 

1668 births
1706 deaths
Royal Scots Greys officers
Scottish generals
Younger sons of marquesses